Jim Lorimer (October 7, 1926 – November 24, 2022) was an attorney and Special Agent of the F.B.I. who organized the Arnold Sports Festival since 1989. Lorimer served as Mayor and Vice Mayor of Worthington, Ohio, for 52 years.

Early life and education
Lorimer was born on October 7, 1926, in Bristol, Pennsylvania.
He served in the U.S. Navy during World War II. In 1949, he graduated with a Bachelor of Arts degree from Ursinus College and in 1951, Jim earned a law degree from the Penn State Dickinson School of Law.

Career
Lorimer founded the Ohio Track Club woman’s team.
He was chair of the US Olympic Committee for Women’s Sports. He worked as an FBI agent and an executive at Nationwide Insurance.

Personal life and death
In 1949, Lorimer married Martha Jean Whittaker. They had three children and four grandchildren. He died on November 24, 2022, at the age of 96.

Awards and honors
In 2005 Iron Man awarded Lorimer its Lifetime Achievement Award.
In 2002, Lorimer received the Arnold Schwarzenegger Classic Lifetime Achievement Award.

References
 

1926 births
2022 deaths
Arnold Schwarzenegger
Sports in Columbus, Ohio
People from Bristol, Pennsylvania
People from Worthington, Ohio
Dickinson School of Law alumni
Ursinus College alumni
Federal Bureau of Investigation agents
Military personnel from Pennsylvania
Mayors of places in Ohio